Callibaetis ferrugineus is a species of small minnow mayfly in the family Baetidae. It is found in North America.

Subspecies
These two subspecies belong to the species Callibaetis ferrugineus:
 Callibaetis ferrugineus ferrugineus (Walsh, 1862)
 Callibaetis ferrugineus hageni Eaton, 1885

References

Mayflies
Articles created by Qbugbot
Insects described in 1862